Falagria is a genus of rove beetles in the family Staphylinidae. There are more than 30 described species in Falagria.

Species
These 32 species belong to the genus Falagria:

 Falagria alutipennis Cameron, 1939
 Falagria angulata Casey
 Falagria brevisulcus Pace, 2008
 Falagria caesa Erichson, 1837
 Falagria cingulata LeConte, 1866
 Falagria coarcticollis Fauvel, 1898
 Falagria cribata Pace, 1984
 Falagria currax Sharp, 1880
 Falagria dissecta Erichson, 1840
 Falagria furoris Pace, 2008
 Falagria infima Sharp, 1883
 Falagria inornata Sharp, 1883
 Falagria iowana Casey
 Falagria ithacana Casey
 Falagria latesulcata Cameron, 1939
 Falagria myrmecolucida Pace, 2008
 Falagria neozealandicola Pace, 2015
 Falagria nitidula Sharp, 1883
 Falagria pallipennis Cameron, 1939
 Falagria peinantamontis Pace, 2008
 Falagria quadrata Sharp, 1883
 Falagria schawalleri Coiffait
 Falagria seminitens Cameron, 1933
 Falagria splendens Kraatz, 1858
 Falagria sterilis Casey
 Falagria subsimilis Casey
 Falagria sulcata (Paykull, 1789)
 Falagria sulcatula (Gravenhorst, 1806)
 Falagria taiwaelegans Pace, 2008
 Falagria taiwarorida Pace, 2008
 Falagria texana Casey
 Falagria tranquillitatis Pace, 2008

References

Further reading

 
 
 
 

Aleocharinae
Articles created by Qbugbot